Petar (Pere) Naumov Toshev (1865-1912) was a Bulgarian teacher and a revolutionary and activist of the Internal Macedonian-Adrianople Revolutionary Organization. In the historiography in North Macedonia he is considered an ethnic Macedonian revolutionary.

Early life
Toshev was born in the town of Prilep, then part of the Ottoman Empire. He studied at the Bulgarian Exarchate's school in Prilep and the Bulgarian Men's High School of Thessaloniki. Later Pere attended the Gymnazium in Plovdiv, capital of the recently created Eastern Rumelia. Here he joined the Bulgarian Secret Central Revolutionary Committee founded in 1885. The original purpose of the committee was to gain autonomy for  the region of Macedonia  (then called Western Rumelia), but it played an important role in the organization of the  Unification of Bulgaria and Eastern Rumelia. During the Serbo-Bulgarian War of 1885, he joined the Bulgarian Army as a volunteer. During 1885-1890 Pere Toshev and Andrey Lyapchev organised a series of secret meetings in the villages around Plovdiv. They decided to organize a new Macedonian-Adrianople liberation organization. In 1890, they were on an intelligence touring through Macedonia.

Teacher and activist
In the period 1892–1893, Toshev worked as a Bulgarian Exarchate teacher together with Dame Gruev in Macedonia. After joining the IMARO, he became an activist. In 1900 Toshev conducted the ceremony inducting the members of the CC of the Bulgarian Secret Revolutionary Brotherhood, including Ivan Garvanov into the IMARO. In 1901, Pere was exiled by the Ottoman authorities in Asia Minor. During the Ilinden Uprising in 1903, he led a detachment in the region of Mariovo. He was a delegate at  the Prilep Congress of IMARO in 1904. At the Rila Congress of IMARO in 1905 he was elected as a member of the CC of the Organization. In the massization of Serbian propaganda in Macedonia, Pere Toshev attempted to neutralize peacefully the Serbian bands in the area. After the capture of Dame Gruev by the Serbs he personally met Gligor Sokolović, and subsequently Dame Gruev was released. After Ivan Garvanov and Boris Sarafov's murder, he was briefly arrested as a suspected. After the Young Turk Revolution, Pere Toshev opposed the legalization of the Organization. Toshev, Anton Strashimirov and Gyorche Petrov published the newspapers "Konstitutsionna zarya" and "Edinstvo", close to the People's Federative Party (Bulgarian Section). In 1910-1911 he was a school inspector of the Bulgarian schools in the Salonica revolutionary district. Toshev was killed by the Turks in Drenovo, near Kavadarci in 1912.

Anastas Lozanchev wrote about him in his account of IMARO's founding in 1894: „Pere had clearly defined ideas, with defined views on the revolutionary struggles, which no one else at that time had. He was an old revolutionary; he had participated together with other Macedonian Bulgarians... in the unification of Northern and Southern Bulgaria.“

References

Sources
 Пере Тошев (Личност и Дело), Светозар Тошев, печатница „Кишкилов”—Асеновград, 1942 г.(Bg.)
 Пере Тошев - съвестта на Македония. Силата на документите. Цочо В. Билярски.

1865 births
1912 deaths
People from Prilep
Members of the Internal Macedonian Revolutionary Organization
Bulgarian revolutionaries
Bulgarian military personnel
People of the Serbo-Bulgarian War
Recipients of the Order of Bravery
Bulgarian people imprisoned abroad
Exiles from the Ottoman Empire
Bulgarian educators
Macedonian Bulgarians
Bulgarian Men's High School of Thessaloniki alumni
Assassinated Bulgarian people
People murdered in the Ottoman Empire
Bulgarian people murdered abroad
1912 murders in the Ottoman Empire